Praia de Chaves (also: Praia da Chave) is a beach in the western part of the island of Boa Vista in Cape Verde, close to the town Rabil. It is about 5 km long. 

At the northern part of the beach, close to Rabil, tourist resorts have been developed. The southern part is included in the Morro de Areia Nature Reserve.

See also
List of beaches of Cape Verde
Tourism in Cape Verde

References

Beaches of Cape Verde
Geography of Boa Vista, Cape Verde